The Invisible Man is an 1897 novel by H. G. Wells.

The Invisible Man or Invisible Men or variation, may also refer to:

 Invisible person, a science fiction concept

Literature
Griffin (The Invisible Man), the title character in Wells' novel
Invisible Man, a 1952 novel by Ralph Ellison
"The Invisible Man", a short story by G. K. Chesterton
The invisible man : the life and liberties of H.G. Wells a biography of Wells by Michael Coren
 A Láthatatlan Ember (The Invisible Man) or Slave of the Huns, a 1901 Hungarian novel by Géza Gárdonyi

Film
 The Invisible Man (1933 film), a 1933 film based on the original story starring Claude Rains
The Invisible Man Returns, a 1940 film starring Vincent Price
The Invisible Man's Revenge, a 1944 film
The Invisible Man Appears, a 1949 film loosely based on the original story
Abbott and Costello Meet the Invisible Man, a 1951 film starring Bud Abbott and Lou Costello
 Invisible Man (1954 film), A Japanese adaptation directed by Motoyoshi Oda and produced by Toho
The Invisible Man vs. The Human Fly, a 1957 film loosely based on the original story
 The Invisible Man (1984 film), a Soviet film adaptation
 The Invisible Man (2020 film), a modern adaptation of both the novel by H. G. Wells and the 1933 film of the same name

Television
The Invisible Man (1958 TV series), a British television series loosely based on the original story
The Invisible Man (1975 TV series), a short-lived American television series starring David McCallum
The Invisible Man (1984 TV series), a 1984 BBC adaptation of the original novel
The Invisible Man (2000 TV series), a Sci-Fi Channel series
The Invisible Man (2005 TV series), a French animated series
The Invisible Man (game show), a Russian game show

Music
The Invisible Man (album), a 2001 album by Mark Eitzel
The Invisible Man, the English name of Michael Cretu's 1985 album Die Chinesische Mauer
"The Invisible Man" (song), a 1989 song by Queen
"The Invisible Man", a song by Elvis Costello and the Attractions from the 1983 album Punch the Clock
"The Invisible Man", a song by Marillion from the 2004 album Marbles
"The Invisible Man", a 1984 single by The Trudy
"Invisible Man" (song), a 1997 song by 98 Degrees
"Invisible Man", a song by The Breeders from the 1993 album Last Splash
"Invisible Man", a song by Theory of a Deadman from the 2002 album Theory of Deadman
"Invisible Man", a song by The Third Rail (band) from the 1967 album Id Music
 The Invisible Men, songwriting and producer trio of Jason Pebworth, George Astasio and Jon Shave
 Invisible Men, a 1983 album by Anthony Phillips

Other uses
 The Invisible Man (painting), a 1933 oil on canvas work by Salvador Dalí

See also

 Invisible Woman (disambiguation)
 Invisible Girl (disambiguation)
 Invisible Boy (disambiguation)
 Invisible Kid (disambiguation)
 Memoirs of an Invisible Man, a science-fiction novel by H. F. Saint, and its 1992 film adaptation
 Seven Invisible Men (2005 film) Lithuanian drama film
 Hollow Man, a film based on the concept of an invisible man